The 2016 NAIA Division II Men’s Basketball national championship was held in March at Keeter Gymnasium in Point Lookout, Missouri.  The 25th annual NAIA basketball tournament featured thirty-two teams playing in a single-elimination format.  The championship game was won by the Indiana Wesleyan Wildcats of Marion, Indiana over the Saint Francis Cougars of Fort Wayne, Indiana by a score of 69 to 66.

Championship game
Indiana Wesleyan won their second national championship in three years.  This was the fourth meeting of the year between the Crossroads League rivals.  Saint Francis won two regular season contests in addition to edging Indiana Wesleyan in the league's year-end tournament.  In the NAIA championship, Saint Francis fell behind early, with the first half deficit reaching 13 points.  With the lead still six points at half-time, Indiana Wesleyan held off the Cougars to win against the then-#1-team in the nation.

Tourney awards and honors

Team award
Dr. James Naismith/Emil Liston Team Sportsmanship Award: Dakota Wesleyan (SD)

Individual awards
Most Outstanding Player: Jonny Marlin, Indiana Wesleyan
Championship Hustle Award: Vasha Davis, IU East (IN)
NABC/NAIA Division II Coach of the Year: Greg Tonagel, Indiana Wesleyan
Rawlings-NAIA Division II National Coach of the Year: Chad LaCross, Saint Francis (IN)

2016 NAIA Division II Men’s Basketball All-Championship Team

Statistical leaders
(minimum 4 games)

Bracket

 * denotes game decided in overtime

Epilogue

NAIA Division II Men’s Basketball All-America Teams
The 2016 All-America team, headed by Davenport's Dominez Burnett for the second straight year, included many standouts from the tournament.

1st Team

 - denotes NAIA/NABC Player of the Year

2nd Team

3rd Team

Honorable Mention

See also
2016 NAIA Division I men's basketball tournament
2016 NCAA Division I men's basketball tournament
2016 NCAA Division II men's basketball tournament
2016 NCAA Division III men's basketball tournament
2016 NAIA Division II women's basketball tournament

References

NAIA Men's Basketball Championship
2016 in sports in Missouri
Tournament